Statute Law Review is a peer reviewed academic journal of law. It is published by Oxford University Press.

The editor is Daniel Greenberg.

References 

Oxford University Press academic journals
Law journals
Publications established in 1980
British law journals